The Czech Pirate Party leadership election of 2018 was held on 6 January 2018. It will be held after successful 2017 legislative election. The incumbent leader Ivan Bartoš ran for another term. Bartoš was the only candidate and was reelected by winning 276 votes. Only 17 members voted against him.

Background
Czech Pirate Party became the third largest party in the Czech Republic after 2017 legislative election. Party's statutes state that next leadership election should be held no later than 3 months after legislative election. The incumbent leader Ivan Bartoš announced he will seek another term and asked for nomination of Liberec region organisation.

References

Czech Pirate Party leadership elections
2018 elections in the Czech Republic
Single-candidate elections
Czech Pirate Party leadership election